Be Home for Dinner (Traditional Chinese: (誰家灶頭無煙火) is an TVB modern sitcom series.

Synopsis
Chung Kwok-Chu (Elliot Ngok) is a renowned food critic and an assistant editor-in-chief of a newspaper, Ko Jim Daily.  When his son, Si-Hon (Jason Chan) returns from Canada, Chu is disappointed to find that Si Hon intends to become a chef rather than taking up a professional career.  His attempts to guide his son away are thwarted when Shum Bui-yee (Kristal Tin), a well-known and respected chef, reluctantly accepts Si-Hon as her assistant.

At the Chung household, Chu has to face his bickering younger brother Kwok-Tung (Stephen Au) and Si-Hon's aunt, Suen Ma-lei (Yvonne Lam), his second wife Bo Kwai Sum (Helena Ma) who worries that she is not doing enough as a stepmother, and how children, half-siblings Si-Hon and Si-Na (Katy Kung) do not understand fine foods as he does.  As members of his family manage to find a way to get along, Chu and his family find that friends and co-workers changing their family dynamic again.

Cast
 Elliot Ngok as Chung Kwok-chu, Sam's father, a magazine editor-in-chief
 Jason Chan as Si Hon "Sam" Chung, an aspiring pastry chef
 Kristal Tin as Carmen Sum (Sum Bui-yee), Sam's master
 Stephen Au as Chung Kwok-tung, Kwok-chu's younger brother
Seth Leslie as Joe Smith, Sam's best friend from Canada
 Yvonne Lam as Mari Suen, Kwok-chu's sister-in-law from his first marriage, Sam's maternal aunt
 Helen Ma as Dau Kwai-lam, Chu's second wife and Si-Na's mother, Sam's stepmother
 Katy Kung as Si Na "Julia" Chung, Sam's younger half-sister
 Queenie Chu as Jackie Yeung
 Océane Zhu as Susan Nin
 Becky Lee as Tong Jing-jing (Sum Hoi-yee), a freelance writer, revealed to be Carmen's estranged younger sister
 Dickson Lee as Chin Dai-kwan
 Mat Yeung as Tin Hoi
 Lily Ho as Tseun Ding-kei, a dedicated writer

Awards and nominations

45th TVB Anniversary Awards 2011
Nominated: Best Drama
Nominated: Best Actor (Stephen Au)
Nominated: Best Actress (Kristal Tin)
Nominated: Best Supporting Actor (Matt Yeung)
Nominated: Best Supporting Actress (Yvonne Lam)
Nominated: My Favourite Male Character (Stephen Au)
Nominated: My Favourite Male Character (Jason Chan)
Nominated: My Favourite Female Character (Kristal Tin)
Nominated: Most Improved Male Artiste (Jason Chan)
Nominated: Most Improved Male Artiste (Matt Yeung)
Nominated: Most Improved Female Artiste (Katy Kung)

Viewership ratings

References

External links
TVB.com Be Home for Dinner - Official Website 
K-TVB.net

TVB dramas
2011 Hong Kong television series debuts
2011 Hong Kong television series endings
Television series about journalism